Khulhama is a small village situated next to Nadihal, in Bandipora District, in the Indian union territory of Jammu and Kashmir. Its name is derived from Khul - stream or river, and Hama - region or village. It is located below the foot of Nadihal and includes a large wetland.

Location
Khulhama is an island region west of Nadihal on the banks of a river called a big stream or big river. It is about 6 km from the town of Bandipore. It is separated from Nadihal by a large river and bounded by 3 water bodies; Wular Lake to the north and south, and two rivers to the east and west. Nadihal, Lankrichpora, Gundidachna and Vijhara are its neighbouring villages.

Geography 
Its altitude is 1578 meters above sea level. Khulhama consists of two mohallas: one from main bridge downwards as far as the Jamia Masjid, and one from Masjid onwards to the new colonies on the other bank of the same river.

Economy
It is a densely populated region because of the easy availability of resources and food. It hosts pastures, lakes and rivers. More than half of Khulhama's area is covered with woodland. Its agriculture is poor, although rice, maize, vegetables, peanuts and beans are cultivated. The soil in Khulhama is rich in humidity, moisture, water and poor in calcium, phosphorus, iron and minerals.

Fishery 
More than half of its people work as fishers, hunters and sand collectors around Wular lake (one of Asia's largest freshwater lakes) and other local waters. It is rich in several aquatic life forms. Fish species include Kashmiri, Russian Punjabi, Rainbow Trout and Silver Trout. About 75–90 kg of fish every day are sold in Nadihal, Vvijhara, Poora Ajas, Sumbal, Papachan, Gamroo and as far away as Srinagar and central Kashmir.

Livestock 
Livestock including40

Khulhama is Bandipore's leading egg producer. It also leads in the production of milk, skin and meat, aquatic birds and animals.

Religion
The majority of residents practice Islam. Two mosques are there.

Education

Western style educational facilities up to the middle school level are located within the village. Secondary education is available in Nadihal. The nearest college is in Bandipora.

Demography
The primary languages are Kashmiri, Hindi and Urdu.

The population of Nadihal is 3000. The literacy rate is 62%.

Culture 
Cricket is their main sporting activity. Besides the spare timers use music as their pass time. Sofiana music Lovers listen to live Kashmiri Chakri.

References

Villages in Bandipora district